Peat, also referred to as turf (a word that also refers to soil with grass distinct from peat), is an accumulation of partially decayed vegetation or organic matter. It is unique to natural areas called peatlands, bogs, mires, moors, or muskegs. Globally, peat stores up to 550 Gt of carbon, 42% of all soil carbon, which exceeds the carbon stored in all other vegetation types, including the world's forests, although it covers just 3% of the land's surface.
Sphagnum moss, also called peat moss, is one of the most common components in peat, although many other plants can contribute. The biological features of sphagnum mosses act to create a habitat aiding peat formation, a phenomenon termed 'habitat manipulation'. Soils consisting primarily of peat are known as histosols. Peat forms in wetland conditions, where flooding or stagnant water obstructs the flow of oxygen from the atmosphere, slowing the rate of decomposition. Peat properties such as organic matter content and saturated hydraulic conductivity can exhibit high spatial heterogeneity.
 
Peatlands, particularly bogs, are the primary source of peat;
although less common, other wetlands, including fens, pocosins, and peat swamp forests, also deposit peat. Landscapes covered in peat are home to specific kinds of plants including Sphagnum moss, ericaceous shrubs, and sedges. Because organic matter accumulates over thousands of years, peat deposits provide records of past vegetation and climate by preserving plant remains, such as pollen. This allows the reconstruction of past environments and the study of changes in land use.

Peat is used by gardeners and for horticulture in certain parts of the world, but this is being banned in some places. By volume, there are about 4 trillion cubic metres of peat in the world. Over time, the formation of peat is often the first step in the geological formation of fossil fuels such as coal, particularly low-grade coal such as lignite.

Centuries of burning and draining of peat by humans has released a significant amount of  into the atmosphere, and much peatland restoration is needed to help limit climate change.

Formation

Peat forms when plant material does not fully decay in acidic and anaerobic conditions. It is composed mainly of wetland vegetation: principally bog plants including mosses, sedges, and shrubs. As it accumulates, the peat holds water. This slowly creates wetter conditions that allow the area of wetland to expand. Peatland features can include ponds, ridges, and raised bogs. The characteristics of some bog plants actively promote bog formation. For example, sphagnum mosses actively secrete tannins, which preserve organic material. Sphagnum also have special water-retaining cells, known as hyaline cells, which can release water ensuring the bogland remains constantly wet which helps promote peat production.

Most modern peat bogs formed 12,000 years ago in high latitudes after the glaciers retreated at the end of the last ice age. Peat usually accumulates slowly at the rate of about a millimetre per year.

Types of peat material
Peat material is either fibric, hemic, or sapric. Fibric peats are the least decomposed and consist of intact fibre. Hemic peats are partially decomposed and sapric are the most decomposed.

Phragmites peat are composed of reed grass, Phragmites australis, and other grasses. It is denser than many other types of peat.

Engineers may describe a soil as peat which has a relatively high percentage of organic material. This soil is problematic because it exhibits poor consolidation properties – it cannot be easily compacted to serve as a stable foundation to support loads, such as roads or buildings.

Peatlands distribution 
In a widely cited article, Joosten and Clarke (2002) described peatlands or mires (which they claim are the same) asthe most widespread of all wetland types in the world, representing 50 to 70% of global wetlands. In these ecosystems are found one third of the world's soil carbon and 10% of global freshwater resources. These ecosystems are characterized by the unique ability to accumulate and store dead organic matter from Sphagnum and many other non-moss species, as peat, under conditions of almost permanent water saturation. Peatlands are adapted to the extreme conditions of high water and low oxygen content, of toxic elements and low availability of plant nutrients. Their water chemistry varies from alkaline to acidic. Peatlands occur on all continents, from the tropical to boreal and Arctic zones from sea level to high alpine conditions.

A more recent estimate from an improved global peatland map, PEATMAP, based on a meta-analysis of geospatial information at global, regional and national levels puts global coverage slightly higher than earlier peatland inventories at 4.23 million square kilometres (1.63 million square miles) approximately 2.84% of the world land area. About 60% of the world's wetlands are made of peat.

Peat deposits are found in many places around the world, including northern Europe and North America. The North American peat deposits are principally found in Canada and the Northern United States. Some of the world's largest peatlands include the West Siberian Lowland, the Hudson Bay Lowlands, and the Mackenzie River Valley.
There is less peat in the Southern Hemisphere, in part because there is less land. That said, the world's largest tropical peatland is located in Africa (the Democratic Republic of Congo). In addition, the vast Magellanic Moorland in South America (Southern Patagonia/Tierra del Fuego) is an extensive peat-dominated landscape. Peat can be found in New Zealand, Kerguelen, the Falkland Islands, and Indonesia (Kalimantan [Sungai Putri, Danau Siawan, Sungai Tolak], Rasau Jaya (West Kalimantan), and Sumatra).

About 7% of all peatlands have been exploited for agriculture and forestry. Under certain conditions, peat will turn into lignite coal over geologic periods of time.

General characteristics and uses

Traditionally peat is cut by hand and  left to dry in the sun.  But for industrial uses, companies may use pressure to extract water from the peat, which is soft and easily compressed, and once dry can be used as fuel. In many countries, including Ireland and Scotland, peat was traditionally stacked to dry in rural areas and used for cooking and domestic heating.

Peat can be a major fire hazard and is not extinguished by light rain. Peat fires may burn for great lengths of time, or smoulder underground and reignite after winter if an oxygen source is present. Because they are easily compressed under minimal weight, peat deposits pose major difficulties to builders of structures, roads, and railways. When the West Highland railway line was built across Rannoch Moor in western Scotland, its builders had to float the tracks on a multi-thousand-ton mattress of tree roots, brushwood, earth and ash.

Peatland can also be an important source of drinking water providing nearly 4% of all potable water stored in reservoirs. In the UK, 43% of the population receives drinking water sourced from peatlands, with the number climbing to 68% in Ireland. Catchments containing peatlands are the main source of water for large cities, including Dublin.

In the Bronze and Iron Ages, people used peat bogs for rituals to nature gods and spirits. Bodies of the victims of such sacrifices have been found in various places in Scotland, England, Ireland, and especially northern Germany and Denmark. They are almost perfectly preserved by the tanning properties of the acidic water (see Tollund Man for one of the most famous examples of a bog body). Peat wetlands also used to have a degree of metallurgical importance in the Early Middle Ages, being the primary source of bog iron used to create swords and armour. Many peat swamps along the coast of Malaysia serve as a natural means of flood mitigation, with any overflow being absorbed by the peat, provided forests are still present to prevent peat fires.

Characteristics and uses by nation

Finland

The climate, geography, and environment of Finland favours bog and peat bog formation. Thus, peat is available in considerable quantities. It is burned to produce heat and electricity. Peat provides around 4% of Finland's annual energy production.

Also, agricultural and forestry-drained peat bogs actively release more CO2 annually than is released in peat energy production in Finland. The average regrowth rate of a single peat bog, however, is indeed slow, from 1,000 up to 5,000 years. Furthermore, it is a common practice to forest used peat bogs instead of giving them a chance to renew. This leads to lower levels of CO2 storage than the original peat bog.

At 106 g CO2/MJ, the carbon dioxide emissions of peat are higher than those of coal (at 94.6 g CO2/MJ) and natural gas (at 56.1). According to one study, increasing the average amount of wood in the fuel mixture from the current 2.6% to 12.5% would take the emissions down to 93 g CO2/MJ. That said, little effort is being made to achieve this.

The International Mire Conservation Group (IMCG) in 2006 urged the local and national governments of Finland to protect and conserve the remaining pristine peatland ecosystems. This includes the cessation of drainage and peat extraction in intact mire sites and the abandoning of current and planned groundwater extraction that may affect these sites. A proposal for a Finnish peatland management strategy was presented to the government in 2011, after a lengthy consultation phase.

Ireland

In the Republic of Ireland, a state-owned company called  was responsible for managing peat extraction. It processed the extracted peat into milled peat which was used in power stations and sold processed peat fuel in the form of peat briquettes which are used for domestic heating. These are oblong bars of densely compressed, dried, and shredded peat. Peat moss is a manufactured product for use in garden cultivation. Turf (dried out peat sods) is also commonly used in rural areas.

In January 2021 Bord na Móna announced that it had ceased all peat harvesting and cutting operations and would be moving its business to a climate solutions company.

In 2022 the sale of peat for burning was prohibited, but some people are still allowed to cut and burn it.

Russia

Use of peat for energy production was prominent in the Soviet Union, especially in 1965. In 1929, over 40% of the Soviet Union's electric energy came from peat, which dropped to 1% by 1980.

In the 1960s, larger sections of swamps and bogs in Western Russia were drained for agricultural and mining purposes.

The Netherlands
2,500 years ago, the area now named the Netherlands was largely covered with peat. Drainage and excavation have lowered the surface of the peatlands. In the west of the country dikes and mills were built, creating polders so that dwelling and economic activities could continue below sea level, the first polder probably in 1533 and the last one in 1968. 
Harvesting of peat could continue in suitable locations as the lower peat layers below current sea level became exposed. This peat was deposited before the rise of the sea level in the Holocene. As a result, approximately 26% of the area and 21% of the population of the Netherlands are presently below sea level.

In 2020, the Netherlands imported 2,156 million kg of peat (5.39 million m3 (400 kg/m3 dry peat) ): 44.5% from Germany (2020), 9.5% from Estonia (2018), 9.2% from Latvia (2020), 7.2% from Ireland (2018), 8.0% from Sweden (2019), 6.5% from Lithuania (2020), 5.1% from Belgium (2019) and 1.7% from Denmark (2019)); 1,35 million kg was exported.<ref>CBS (opendata.cbs.nl), Goederensoorten naar land; minerale brandstoffen en chemie (tr. "Goods by country; mineral fuels and chemistry")</ref> Most is used in gardening and greenhouse horticulture.

Since the Netherlands did not have many trees to use as firewood or charcoal, one use the Dutch made of the available peat was to fire kilns to make pottery.   During World War II, the Dutch Resistance came up with an unusual use for peat.  Since peat was so available in the fields, resistance fighters sometimes stacked peat into human-sized piles and used the piles for target practice.

Estonia
After oil shale in Estonia, peat is the second most mined natural resource. The peat production sector has a yearly revenue of around €100 million and it is mostly export-oriented.

India
Sikkim
The mountains of the Himalaya and Tibetan Plateau contains pockets of high-altitude wetlands. Khecheopalri is one of the Sikkim's most famous and diverse peatlands in the eastern Indian territory of Sikkim, which includes 682 species representing 5 kingdoms, 196 families, and 453 genera.

United Kingdom
England
England has around 1 million acres of peatland. Peatland in England store 584m tonnes of carbon in total but emit around 11m tonnes of  every year due to degradation and draining. In 2021 only 124 people owned 60% of England's peat land.

The extraction of peat from the Somerset Levels began during the Roman times and has been carried out since the Levels were first drained. On Dartmoor, there were several commercial distillation plants formed and run by the British Patent Naphtha Company in 1844. These produced naphtha on a commercial scale from the high-quality local peat.

Fenn's, Whixall and Bettisfield Mosses is an element of a post-Ice Age peat bog that straddles the England–Wales border and contains many rare plant and animal species due to the acidic environment created by the peat. Only lightly hand-dug, it is now a national nature reserve and is being restored to its natural condition.

Industrial extraction of peat occurred at the Thorne Moor site, outside Doncaster near to the village of Hatfield. Government policy incentivised commercial removal to peat for agricultural use. This caused much destruction of the area during the 1980s. The removal of the peat resulted in later flooding further downstream at Goole due to the loss of water retaining peatlands. Recently regeneration of peatland has occurred as part of the Thorne Moors project, and at Fleet Moss, organised by Yorkshire Wildlife Trust.

Northern Ireland
In Northern Ireland, there is small-scale domestic turf cutting in rural areas, but areas of bogs have been diminished because of changes in agriculture. In response, afforestation has seen the establishment of tentative steps towards conservation such as Peatlands Park, County Armagh which is an Area of Special Scientific Interest.

Scotland
Some Scotch whisky distilleries, such as those on Islay, use peat fires to dry malted barley. The drying process takes about 30 hours. This gives the whiskies a distinctive smoky flavour, often called "peatiness".
The peatiness, or degree of peat flavour, of a whisky, is calculated in ppm of phenol. Normal Highland whiskies have a peat level of up to 30 ppm, and the whiskies on Islay usually have up to 50 ppm. In rare types like the Octomore, the whisky can have more than 100 ppm of phenol. Scotch Ales can also use peat roasted malt, imparting a similar smoked flavor.

 Wales 
Wales has over 70,000 hectares of peatlands. Most of it is blanket peat bog in the highlands, but there are a few hundred hectares of peatland in lowland areas. Some peatland areas in Wales are in poor condition.  In 2020, the Welsh Government established a five-year peatland restoration initiative, which will be implemented by Natural Resources Wales (NRW).

Canada
Canada is the top exporter of peat by value. In 2021, top exporters of peat (including peat litter), whether or not agglomerated, were Canada ($580,591.39K, 1,643,950,000 kg), European Union ($445,304.42K, 2,362,280,000 kg), Latvia ($275,459.14K, 2,184,860,000 kg), Netherlands ($235,250.84K, 1,312,850,000 kg), Germany ($223,414.66K, 1,721,170,000 kg).

Generic characteristics and uses
Agriculture

In Sweden, farmers use dried peat to absorb excrement from cattle that are wintered indoors. The most important property of peat is retaining moisture in container soil when it is dry while preventing the excess of water from killing roots when it is wet. Peat can store nutrients although it is not fertile itself – it is polyelectrolytic with a high ion-exchange capacity due to its oxidized lignin. Peat is discouraged as a soil amendment by the Royal Botanic Gardens, Kew, England, since 2003. While bark-based peat-free potting soil mixes are on the rise, particularly in the UK, peat remains an important raw material for horticulture in some other European countries, Canada, as well as parts of the United States.

Freshwater aquaria
Peat is sometimes used in freshwater aquaria. It is seen most commonly in soft water or blackwater river systems such as those mimicking the Amazon River basin. In addition to being soft in texture and therefore suitable for demersal (bottom-dwelling) species such as Corydoras catfish, peat is reported to have a number of other beneficial functions in freshwater aquaria. It softens water by acting as an ion exchanger; it also contains substances that are beneficial for plants, and for the reproductive health of fishes. Peat can prevent algae growth and kill microorganisms. Peat often stains the water yellow or brown due to the leaching of tannins.

Balneotherapy
Peat is widely used in balneotherapy (the use of bathing to treat disease). Many traditional spa treatments include peat as part of peloids. Such health treatments have an enduring tradition in European countries including Poland, the Czech Republic, Germany, and Austria. Some of these old spas date back to the 18th century and are still active today. The most common types of peat application in balneotherapy are peat muds, poultices, and suspension baths.

 Peat archives 
Authors Rydin and Jeglum in Biology of Habitats described the concept of peat archives, a phrase coined by influential peatland scientist Harry Godwin in 1981.

In Quaternary Palaeoecology, first published in 1980, Birks and Birks described how paleoecological studies "of peat can be used to reveal what plant communities were present (locally and regionally), what time period each community occupied, how environmental conditions changed, and how the environment affected the ecosystem in that time and place."

Scientists continue to compare modern mercury (Hg) accumulation rates in bogs with historical natural-archives records in peat bogs and lake sediments to estimate the potential human impacts on the biogeochemical cycle of mercury, for example. Over the years, different dating models and technologies for measuring date sediments and peat profiles accumulated over the last 100–150 years, have been used, including the widely used vertical distribution of 210Pb, the inductively coupled plasma mass spectrometry (ICP-SMS), and more recently the initial penetration (IP).  In some cases, naturally mummified human bodies, often called "bog bodies", such as the Tollund Man in Denmark, having been discovered in 1950 and dated to have lived during the 4th century BC after being mistaken for a recent murder victim, have been discovered and exhumed for scientific purposes; prior to that, another "bog body", the Elling Woman, had been discovered in 1938 in the same bog about 60 m (200 ft) from the Tollund Man. She is believed to have lived during the late 3rd century BC and was ultimately a ritual sacrifice.

 Peat hags 

Peat "hags" are a form of erosion that occurs at the sides of gullies that cut into the peat or, sometimes, in isolation. Hags may result when flowing water cuts downwards into the peat and when fire or overgrazing exposes the peat surface. Once the peat is exposed in these ways, it is prone to further erosion by wind, water, and livestock. The result is overhanging vegetation and peat. Hags are too steep and unstable for vegetation to establish itself, so they continue to erode unless restorative action is taken.

Environmental and ecological issues

The distinctive ecological conditions of peat wetlands provide a habitat for distinctive fauna and flora. For example, whooping cranes nest in North American peatlands, while Siberian cranes nest in the West Siberian peatland. Such habitats also have many species of wild orchids and carnivorous plants. It takes centuries for a peat bog to recover from disturbance. (For more on biological communities, see wetland, bog or fen.)

The world's largest peat bog is located in Western Siberia. It is the size of France and Germany combined. Recent studies show that it is thawing for the first time in 11,000 years. As the permafrost melts, it could release billions of tonnes of methane gas into the atmosphere. The world's peatlands are thought to contain 180 to 455 billion metric tonnes of sequestered carbon, and they release into the atmosphere  of methane annually. The peatlands' contribution to long-term fluctuations in these atmospheric gases has been a matter of considerable debate.

One of the characteristics for peat is the bioaccumulations of metals often concentrated in the peat. Accumulated mercury is of significant environmental concern.

Peat drainage
Large areas of organic wetland (peat) soils are currently drained for agriculture, forestry, and peat extraction (i.e. through canals). This process is taking place all over the world. This not only destroys the habitat of many species but also heavily fuels climate change. As a result of peat drainage, the organic carbon – which built over thousands of years and is normally underwater – is suddenly exposed to the air. It decomposes and turns into carbon dioxide, which is released into the atmosphere. The global  emissions from drained peatlands have increased from 1,058 Mton in 1990 to 1,298 Mton in 2008 (a 20% increase). This increase has particularly taken place in developing countries, of which Indonesia, Malaysia, and Papua New Guinea are the fastest-growing top emitters. This estimate excludes emissions from peat fires (conservative estimates amount to at least 4,000 Mton/-eq./yr for south-east Asia). With 174 Mton/-eq./yr the EU is after Indonesia (500 Mton) and before Russia (161 Mton) the world's second-largest emitter of drainage-related peatland  (excl. extracted peat and fires). Total  emissions from the worldwide 500,000 km2 of degraded peatland may exceed 2.0 Gtons (including emissions from peat fires) which is almost 6% of all global carbon emissions.

 Peat fires

Peat has a high carbon content and can burn under low moisture conditions. Once ignited by the presence of a heat source (e.g., a wildfire penetrating the subsurface), it smoulders. These smouldering fires can burn undetected for very long periods of time (months, years, and even centuries) propagating in a creeping fashion through the underground peat layer.

Despite the damage that the burning of raw peat can cause, bogs are naturally subject to wildfires and depend on the wildfires to keep woody competition from lowering the water table and shading out many bog plants. Several families of plants including the carnivorous Sarracenia (trumpet pitcher), Dionaea (Venus flytrap), Utricularia (bladderworts) and non-carnivorous plants such as the sandhills lily, toothache grass and many species of orchid are now threatened and in some cases endangered from the combined forces of human drainage, negligence, and absence of fire.

Peat deposits in Southeast Asia could be destroyed by 2040. web link 

These fires may be responsible for the acceleration in the increase in carbon dioxide levels since 1998.Fred Pearce Massive peat burn is speeding climate change, New Scientist, 6 November 2004 More than 100 peat fires in Kalimantan and East Sumatra have continued to burn since 1997; each year, these peat fires ignite new forest fires above the ground.

In North America, peat fires can occur during severe droughts throughout their occurrence, from boreal forests in Canada to swamps and fens in the subtropical southern Florida Everglades. Once a fire has burnt through the area, hollows in the peat are burnt out, and hummocks are desiccated but can contribute to Sphagnum recolonization.

In the summer of 2010, an unusually high heat wave of up to  ignited large deposits of peat in Central Russia, burning thousands of houses and covering the capital of Moscow with a toxic smoke blanket. The situation remained critical until the end of August 2010.

In June 2019, despite some forest fire prevention methods being put in place, peat fires in the Arctic emitted  of CO2, which is equal to Sweden's total annual emissions. The peat fires are linked to climate change, as they are much more likely to occur nowadays due to this effect.

Protection

In June 2002, the United Nations Development Programme launched the Wetlands Ecosystem and Tropical Peat Swamp Forest Rehabilitation Project. This project was targeted to last for 5 years, and brings together the efforts of various non-government organisations.

In November 2002, the International Peatland (formerly Peat) Society (IPS) and the International Mire Conservation Group (IMCG) published guidelines on the "Wise Use of Mires and Peatlands – Backgrounds and Principles including a framework for decision-making". The aim of this publication is to develop mechanisms that can balance the conflicting demands on the global peatland heritage, to ensure its wise use to meet the needs of humankind.

In June 2008, the IPS published the book Peatlands and Climate Change'', summarising the currently available knowledge on the topic. In 2010, IPS presented a "Strategy for Responsible Peatland Management", which can be applied worldwide for decision-making.

Restoration

The UNEP is supporting peatland restoration in Indonesia. Often, restoration is done by blocking drainage channels in the peatland, and allowing natural vegetation to recover.

See also

 Acid sulfate soil
 Acrotelm
 Climate change mitigation#Preserving and enhancing carbon sinks
 Gytta
 Histosols
 Irish Peatland Conservation Council
 List of bogs
 Peat Cutting Monday
 Tropical peat
 Turbary
 Unified Soil Classification System
 :Category:Peat-fired power stations

Notes

References

External links

 International Peatland Society
 International Mire Conservation Group
 Irish Peatland Conservation Council
 Gardening without peat Royal Horticultural Society
 Peat-free gardens RSPB
 Massive peat burn is speeding climate change From The New Scientist
 Peatlands articles on the BBC
 Meadowview Biological Research Station
 Peat and Peatlands Bibliography

 
Coal
Solid fuels
Sediments
Balneotherapy
Soil improvers
Types of soil
Non-timber forest products
Soil-based building materials
Wetlands